Cop This! is a novel written by Chris Nyst. It is about a bomb explosion in Fortitude Valley, Brisbane. The book was published in 1999 by HarperCollins Publishers Pty Ltd.

Synopsis
In 1969, in Brisbane's Fortitude Valley a car bomb explodes. Eleven people are slain. The repercussions threaten the stability of the government. Johnny Arnold, a low-level criminal is charged with the crime. This brings a father and son duo in conflict with the state's leaders.

Footnotes

External links
 Harper Collins Publishers
 Harper Collins Publishers: Cop This

1999 Australian novels
Australian crime novels
Novels set in Brisbane
Fiction set in 1969
HarperCollins books